Efstathios "Stathis" Belevonis (born 6 February 1998) is a Greek professional footballer who plays as a defender for Super League 2 club Apollon Pontus.

Career 
On 31 January 2020, Belevonis was sent on loan to Messolonghi. The deal was made permanent in September of the same year. Half a season later, in January 2021, Belevonis was sold to Doxa Drama. He joined Panetolikos in the summer, who loaned him out to Kavala for the remainder of the season in January 2022.

References

External links
 

1998 births
Living people
Footballers from Agrinio
Greek footballers
Association football defenders
Panetolikos F.C. players
Tilikratis F.C. players
A.E. Messolonghi F.C. players
Doxa Drama F.C. players
Kavala F.C. players
Apollon Pontou FC players
Super League Greece players
Gamma Ethniki players
Super League Greece 2 players